Military high schools are a type of high school that include military cadet education and so are a form of military academy. They are found in several countries and offer a regular high school education but with an extra military training curriculum. For example, cadets must rise early and do physical training to be followed by games in the afternoon. However, in the same way as a high or secondary school, they have academic classes after breakfast. In the evening, there may be self-study classes. As a part of a military institute, seniority is essential, and the commands of seniors must be obeyed by juniors. The grade works as the rank of the cadets. All cadets from the same batch are considered to be of the same rank. However, in higher grades, prefects are selected to lead the regular cadets.

List

Bangladesh

 Joypurhat Girls Cadet College
 Feni Girls Cadet College
 Comilla Cadet College
 Mymensingh Girls Cadet College
 Pabna Cadet College
 Barisal Cadet College
 Rangpur Cadet College
 Sylhet Cadet College
 Rajshahi Cadet College
 Mirzapur Cadet College
 Jhenaidah Cadet College
 Faujdarhat Cadet College

Brazil 

 Colégio Militar de Belém (CMBel) (Military High School of Belém)
 Colégio Militar de Belo Horizonte (CMBH) (Military High School of Belo Horizonte)
 Colégio Militar de Brasília (CMB) (Military High School of Brasília)
 Colégio Militar de Campo Grande (CMCG) (Military High School of Campo Grande)
 Colégio Militar de Curitiba (CMC) (Military High School of Curitiba)
 Colégio Militar de Fortaleza (CMF) (Military High School of Fortaleza)
 Colégio Militar de Juiz de Fora (CMJF) (Military High School of Juiz de Fora)
 Colégio Militar de Manaus (CMM) (Military High School of Manaus)
 Colégio Militar de Porto Alegre (CMPA) (Military High School of Porto Alegre)
 Colégio Militar do Recife (CMR) (Military High School of Recife)
 Colégio Militar do Rio de Janeiro (CMRJ) (Military High School of Rio de Janeiro)
 Colégio Militar de Salvador (CMS) (Military High School of Salvador)
 Colégio Militar de Santa Maria (CMSM) (Military High School of Santa Maria)
 Colégio Militar de São Paulo (CMSP) (Military High School of São Paulo)

 Colégio Naval (CN) (Naval High School)

 Escola Preparatória de Cadetes do Ar (EPCAR) (Air Cadets Preparatory School)

Canada
 Robert Land Academy

Indonesia
 Taruna Nusantara, Magelang
 Krida Nusantara, Bandung
 Pelita Nusantara, Bandung

Japan 

 JGSDF High Technical School

Malaysia 

 The Royal Military College, Sungai Besi

Nigeria
 Air Force Military School, Jos, Nigeria
Nigerian Navy Secondary School, Abeokuta, Ogun State
Nigerian Navy Secondary School, Ojo, Lagos
 Nigerian Military School, Zaria
Command Secondary Schools

Pakistan

 Cadet College Hasan Abdal
 Cadet College Fateh Jang
 Cadet College Kohat
 Cadet College Larkana
 Cadet College Mastung
 Cadet College Palandri
 Cadet College Petaro
 Cadet College Razmak
 Cadet College Sanghar
 Cadet College Skardu
 Garrison Cadet College Kohat
 Military College Jhelum
 Military College Sui
 Military College Murree
 Pakistan Steel Cadet College
 WAPDA Cadet College Tarbela

Peru
 Leoncio Prado Military Academy

Romania
 Military High School Alexandru Ioan Cuza
 Military High School Dimitrie Cantemir
 Military High School Mihai Viteazu
 Military High School Stefan cel Mare
 Military High School Tudor Vladimirescu

Turkey
 Heybeliada Military High School
 Isiklar Military High School
 Kuleli Military High School
 Maltepe Military High School

United Arab Emirates
 The Military High School, Al-Ain

United States

 Carson Long Military Academy (Permanently closed)
 Carver Military Academy
 Fork Union Military Academy
 Hargrave Military Academy
Marine Military Academy
Massanutten Military Academy
 Missouri Military Academy
 New York Military Academy
 New Mexico Military Institute
Riverside Military Academy

Italy
Scuola navale militare “Francesco Morosini”
Scuola militare teuliè
Scuola militare nunziatella
Scuola aeronautica militare “Giulio Douhet”
  
 
Poland

Country wide "Mundurówka" schools

References

See also
 Military junior college